"Addiction" is a song by Danish singer Medina from her international debut studio album Welcome to Medina. It was released as the third single from the album on 1 November 2010. The electropop song was written by Medina, Providers and Lisa Greene and it was produced by Providers. "Addiction" peaked at number one in Denmark, becoming Medina's fifth number-one single. In the US, the song peaked at number one on Billboards Hot Dance Airplay chart.

Live performances
Medina performed the song on DR's Sport 2010 and during the "Welcome to Medina Tour" in Germany.

Chart performance
"Addiction" debuted at number 59 in Germany and stayed in the chart for nine weeks. In Denmark the song debuted at number 16 on the chart in the release week of the album Welcome to Medina due to a high number of downloads and dropped off the chart two weeks later. On December 17, 2010 "Addiction" peaked at number one in Denmark. The song has spent a total of 21 weeks on the chart, and has since been certified platinum by the International Federation of the Phonographic Industry (IFPI) for sales of 30,000 units. On the issue dated 21 May 2011, "Addiction" peaked at number one on Billboards Hot Dance Airplay chart in the United States.

Track listing
 Danish digital download
 "Addiction" – 2:53
 Danish iTunes digital download EP - (Remixes Vol. 1)
 "Addiction" (Rune RK Remix) – 6:21
 "Addiction" (Traplite Remix) – 5:30
 "Addiction" (Svenstrup & Vendelboe Remix) – 5:07
 German CD single
 "Addiction" – 2:53
 "The One" (Acoustic Version) – 3:55
 German digital download EP
 "Addiction" – 3:37
 "The One" (Acoustic Version) – 3:57
 "Addiction" (Five Star DJ Remix) – 6:28
 US digital download
 "Addiction" (Radio Edit) – 2:53
 "Addiction" (Extended Version) – 5:06

Charts

Weekly charts

Year-end charts

Certifications

Release history

References

External links
 

2010 singles
2011 singles
Number-one singles in Denmark
Dance-pop songs
Synth-pop songs
Medina (singer) songs
Songs written by Rasmus Stabell
Songs written by Lisa Greene
Songs written by Jeppe Federspiel
2010 songs
EMI Records singles
Songs written by Medina (singer)